Alexander Mullenbach (born 1949) is a Luxembourg pianist, composer and conductor. Since 2002, he has been director of the International Summer Academy at the Mozarteum in Salzburg.

Career
Born in Luxembourg City on 23 January 1949, Mullenbach studied piano, chamber music and composition at the Conservatoire de Paris and at the Salzburg Mozarteum where his teachers included Gerhard Wimberger and Cesar Bresgen. From 1970, he taught piano at the Conservatoire de Luxembourg and, from 1981, composition. Since then, he has also taught at the Mozarteum. Since 1978, he has composed over 100 works, of which thirteen for symphony orchestra, as well as an Opera. They have been performed at major music festivals in Salzburg, Echternach, Strasbourg, St.Petersburg, London, Vienna and Munich. Performers have included Heinrich Schiff, Boris Pergamenschikow, Marjana Lipovšek, Roberto Fabbriciani, Julius Berger, Alois Brandhofer, Irena Grafenauer, Elliot Fisk, Kurt Widmer, Edoardo Catemario, Tsuyoshi Tsutsumi, Christina Ortiz, Ruggiero Ricci, Roberto Szidon, Edda Silvestri, Gottfried Schneider, Lewis Kaplan, Yair Kless, Frank Wibaut, Antonello Farulli, Frederico Mondelci, Maria Christina Kiehr, Yoko Amoyal, Elena Denisova, Velislava Georgieva, Françoise Groben,  Michael Vaiman, Frank Stadler, Iride Martinez and the ensembles Wiener Streichsextett, Hagen Quartett, Atlas Quartett, Stadler Quartett, Camerata Salzburg, Musica Viva Dresden, Alter Ego Rome, Atelier Musique Nouvelle de Paris, Klangforum Wien, Österreichisches Ensemble für Neue Musik, Wiener Kammerorchester, Philharmonische Virtuosen Berlin, Parnassus Ensemble London, Mozarteum Quartett Salzburg, Vilnius-Quartett, Pierrot Lunaire Ensemble Vienna, Mozarteum Orchester Salzburg; Orchestre Philharmonique du Luxembourg, Rheinische Philharmonie Koblenz, Orchestre de Chambre du Luxembourg"Les Musiciens", Kammerakademie Neuss/Rhein. Conductors who have directed his symphonic works include Ernest Bour, Leopold Hager, Hans Graf and Udo Zimmermann, David Shallon, Stanislaw Skrowaczewski, Philippe Entremont, Hubert Soudant, Hans Graf, Günter Neuhold, Antoni Wit, Emmanuel Krivine, Daniel Raiskin Jari Hämälainen, Jaap Schroeder, Pierre Cao, Johannes Kalitzke, Marc Soustrot, Sylvain Cambreling. 

He was the founder and chairman  of the Luxembourg New Music Society LGNM (1983-94). He was president of the Luxembourg National Music Council (2000 to 2007), director of the International Summer Academy of Mozarteum Salzburg (2002-2013), artistic director of  Echternach Festival (2007-2013). He is a co-founder and vice-chairman of Luxembourg Music Publishers (LMP). In 2015, he received the title of Doctor Honoris Causa from University of Music “Academie Gheorghe Dima” Cluj in Romania.

Memberships and affiliations

1997: member of the Academia Scientiarum et Artium Europaea in Salzburg and of the Grand Ducal Institute in Luxembourg.
1999: officer of the Order of Adolphe of Nassau, Grand Duchy of Luxembourg
2000: president of the Conseil Supérieur de la Musique in Luxembourg
2002: director of the Mozarteum International Summer Academy in Salzburg.
2007: artistic director of the Festival International Echternach, Luxembourg
2013: Founder and Vice-Chairman of Luxembourg Music Publishers
2015: Doctor Honoris Causa of the Gheorghe Dima Music Academy in Cluj-Napoca, Romania

Compositions
Among his most successful compositions are:
1965: Three Winter Pieces for Piano (completed 1975)
1974: Brixham 4 Songs for Mezzosopr. and Piano on Texts by Jean Krier (completed 1981)
1981: Correspondences for Fl,Clar,Vl,Vc and Piano
1982: Rituel for Trumpet,Vl and Perc.
1987: Art Gallery, for Violin solo (LMP)
1987: Night Music for Piano solo (NMF)
1987: Dream Music II for Fl,Clar,Vl,Vc,and Piano
1987: Karma I for 2 Pianos
1988: Lost Islands for Clar,Vl and Piano
1991: Under the Rainbow (11 pieces for young pianists)(DO)
1991: 3 Choral-Preludes for Organ
1991: Schattenraum, 4 Songs for Mezzo-soprano und 10 Instruments on poems by Peter Härtling
1991: Ritual for Trumpet in C, Violin and Percussion (LMP)
1992: Partita I for Violin solo (DO)
1992: Fluidum for Clar. and Piano (DO)
1992: Volutes, wind quintett (LMP)
1992: 2 Trakl-Lieder für Mittlere Stimme und Klavier (LMP)
1994: Capriccio per Niccolò Paganini, per Violino solo (DO)
1994: Streams for Vl,Double-Bass and Piano
1995: Concerto for Violoncello and String Orchestra
1996: 4 Miniatures for Flute and Piano
1997: String Quartet I (Constructions in Metal) (LMP)
1997: An die Königin der Nacht, for Orchestra
1998: Tombeau for Organ
1998: 2 Songs on poems by Georg Trakl, for Medium Voice and Piano
1999: Piano Quintet (Piano,2Vl,Vla,Vc)(DO)
1999: Dark Crystal, for Orchestra
2000: 5 Songs on poems by G. Ungaretti, for High voice and Piano
2000: Fluidum for Sax.sopr. and Piano
2000: Fluidum for Sax. alto and Piano
2001: In den Wänden des Windes,for Mezzo-Soprano and String Quartet on poems by Brecht,Fleming and Marti
2002: Aimez-vous...Brahms? for Violin solo (LMP)
2002: Zeit - Schatten (Quartett auf das Ende vom Lied) for Clar,Vl,Vc and Piano 
2002: Gesang des Schwarzen Vogels (Song of the Black Bird) for Clar. solo (LMP)
2003: Die Todesbrücke (The Bridge of Death) opera in 2 acts on a libretto by Dzevad Karahasan
2004: Country Music for Violin and Marimba (NMF)
2005: Conversations intimes  for Violin and Double Bass
2005: 3 Songs on poems by Claudia Storz, for Baritone and Guitar
2006: String Quartet II
2006: Partita II for Vcello solo
2009: Das Haus am Watt, on a poem by Jean Krier, for Mezzo-Soprano, Clar. and Piano (LMP)
2009: Concerto for Marimba and String Orchestra  (NMF)
2009: La mer, au loin..., for bass clar. and piano (LMP)
2011: Kein Tier weiss um seinen Tod, on a poem by Claudia Storz,for Sopr.,Woodwind Quintet and Bass-Clar.
2011: Pastorale for piano 4 hands
2011: Partita III for Viola solo
2012: In den Wind gesungen for oboe solo (LMP)
2012: Concerto for Organ and String Orchestra
2013: Aura - Salve Regina de Pontigny, for Vcello solo and 16 voices a capella
2014: 4 Sketches for Horn in F and Piano (LMP)

The works by Alexander Müllenbach are published by Doblinger Edition Vienna (Do), by 
Norsk Musik Forlaget Oslo (NMF), and by Luxembourg Music Publishers (LMP).

Several CD publications, among them: 
Alexander Müllenbach – Wie Haar, das über Steine rinnt und andere Kammermusik  
(5 450482 001265) CNA Dudelange-Luxembourg © by United Instruments of Lucilin

External links

References

1949 births
Living people
20th-century classical composers
20th-century male musicians
21st-century classical composers
21st-century male musicians
Luxembourgian composers
Male classical composers
Members of the European Academy of Sciences and Arts
People from Luxembourg City